Gabriel Vidal Nova (born 5 October 1969) is a Spanish retired footballer who played as a midfielder.

Club career
Born in Palma, Majorca, Balearic Islands, Vidal spent most of his 16-year senior career with local RCD Mallorca, playing in La Liga from 1989 to 1992 and reaching the Copa del Rey final in 1991. He made his top flight debut with his main club on 3 September 1989, coming on as a 63rd-minute substitute in a 0–1 away loss against CA Osasuna.

Vidal also competed at the professional level with CD Leganés and Getafe CF, retiring in 2004 at the age of 34 after a spell with amateurs CD Atlético Baleares.

International career
Vidal was part of Spain's gold medal-winning squad at the 1992 Summer Olympics, in Barcelona.

Honours

Club
Mallorca
Copa del Rey: Runner-up 1990–91

International
Spain U23
Summer Olympic Games: 1992

Spain U16
UEFA European Under-16 Championship: 1986

References

External links

1969 births
Living people
Footballers from Palma de Mallorca
Spanish footballers
Association football midfielders
La Liga players
Segunda División players
Segunda División B players
Tercera División players
RCD Mallorca B players
RCD Mallorca players
CD Leganés players
Getafe CF footballers
Ciudad de Murcia footballers
Granada CF footballers
CD Atlético Baleares footballers
Spain youth international footballers
Spain under-23 international footballers
Olympic footballers of Spain
Olympic gold medalists for Spain
Footballers at the 1992 Summer Olympics
Olympic medalists in football
Medalists at the 1992 Summer Olympics